Suryabhan Vahadane (born 1930) is an Indian politician who is a leader of Bharatiya Janata Party from Maharashtra.  He was a member of the Rajya Sabha from 1996  to 2002. Earlier he was a member of the Maharashtra Legislative Council from 1982 to 1994 and served as its deputy chairman from 1988 to 1994. Patil was the president of state unit of the party in 1994.

References

1930 births
People from Ahmednagar district
Rajya Sabha members from Maharashtra
Members of the Maharashtra Legislative Council
Living people
Marathi politicians
Bharatiya Janata Party politicians from Maharashtra